NQC may refer to:

Not Quite C, a programming language
National Quartet Convention, of musicians in Louisville, Kentucky, US
North Queensland Cowboys, Australian rugby league team
North Queensland Company of the Queensland University Regiment
Net qualifying capacity, power of the electrical generation plant that can be relied on